United Democratic Forces is a coalition of political parties in Bulgaria.

United Democratic Forces may also refer to:
 United Democratic Forces of Belarus
 United Democratic Forces (Benin)
 United Democratic Forces (Congo)
 United Democratic Forces of Rwanda

See also
 Union of Democratic Forces (disambiguation)
 United Democratic Front (disambiguation)